The following is a list of Assyrian clans or tribes of northern Iraq, northeastern Syria, southeastern Turkey, and northwestern Iran.

Tribes 
 Nerwa tribe 
Albaq Tribe
 Alqosh Tribe
 Barwar Tribe
 Baz tribe
 Botan tribe
 Chal Tribe
 Diz Tribe
 Bash-Kalah Tribe (practices Judaism)
 Gawar Tribe
 Halim Tribe
 Jilu Tribe
 Kasran Tribe
 Kakov Tribe
 Mar b'Ishu Tribe
 Nochiya Tribe
 Qodchanis Tribe
 Taimar Tribe
 Tkhuma Tribe
Gunduktha
Mazra
 Tyari Tribe (Lower)
Ashitha
Bnematha
Biraul
Lizen
Minianish
Mnelgipa
Sulbag
Zawita
Nouhara
 Tyari Tribe (Upper)
Banimatu
Byalta
Kelaita
Lakina
Romta
Gérāmon
Serspedo
 Urmia Tribe
Baradost
Margawar
Salamas
Somai
Tergawar
Ushnuk
 Walto Tribe
 Tur Abdin
Amnokiye Tribe
Beth Haydo
Bet Shimun
Urhaye, Bet Rhawi 
Melke Mire 
 Qalu Tribe

References

M.Y.A . Lilian, Assyrians Of The Van District During The Rule Of Ottoman Turks, 1914

 
Turkey-related lists
Iraq-related lists
Syria-related lists

Further reading